"Everything" is a single by Norwegian pop duo M2M, composed of singers Marion Raven and Marit Larsen. It was the first single from the duo's second album, The Big Room.  The single was released worldwide between October 2001 and March 2002. It was well received critically, and reached No. 6 in Norway in addition to being a minor hit in Australia, Italy and New Zealand. A music video directed by Chris Applebaum was released for the single. M2M performed the song on the 100th episode of Dawson's Creek and live at the 2002 Spellemannprisen awards. The song earned M2M a nomination for "Best International Artist" at the 2001 Mnet Asian Music Awards.

Composition
The song is aimed at Zac Hanson, who Marion Raven dated briefly while M2M were on tour with him and his band Hanson in 2000. According to Raven, once the tour ended he never contacted her, effectively ending the relationship. Lyrically, the song speaks of a relationship "gone sour".

Release and promotion
The single was released in South-East Asia in early October 2001, the US in January 2002 and Norway on 4 March 2002. In December 2001 they opened a concert in Kuala Lumpur with the song. On 1 March 2002 they performed the song at the Spellemannprisen awards in front of 7,000 people and over 700,000 viewers. By mid April 2002 the track had received moderate airplay on radio in the US, particularly on the East Coast. Atlantic Records, however, decided not to market the song until M2M made their appearance on the 100th episode of Dawson's Creek, "100 Light Years from Home", on April 17, hoping this would draw extra attention to the band. This decision upset M2M, who had already arrived in the US in the beginning of March to promote the song over a three-week period, though due to Atlantic's decision they returned home to Lørenskog after only one week. M2M performed the song in the episode, after Pacey Witter flirted with Raven. After filming the duo performed the song at a beach party which was attended by the cast of the show. M2M were scheduled to recommence promoting the single and album in the US in May, before moving onto Mexico, Australia and Japan. They arrived in Australia in mid May 2002 to promote both "Everything" and the follow up single, "What You Do About Me".

Reception
The single reached No. 6 in Norway, No. 27 in Australia, No. 37 in Italy and No. 44 in New Zealand. The song earned M2M a nomination for "Best International Artist" at the 2001 Mnet Asian Music Awards.

Chuck Taylor from Billboard called it a "smart, driving song, drenched in glittering harmonies and indelible hooks. Verdens Gang spoke highly of the track. Karen Tye from the Herald Sun called it an "energetic, catchy single". Entertainment Weekly considered it to be one of the "best uptempo tracks" on The Big Room, saying it "recall[ed] the acoustic pop of Hanson (that’s a compliment)." Girl.com.au said the track "sparkle[d] with  melodies, smart and sassy lyrics and of course Marion and Marit's trademark harmony vocals." The Philippine Star said the track was one of the best songs on The Big Room, adding that it was a harder rock sound than usual for the duo.

Music video
The video begins with Raven and Larsen singing the song while driving a convertible, before they perform on a red stage in the desert, along with a backup band. The music video was being played in Asia on MTV and Channel V by November 2001. By mid April 2002 the music video was in rotation on MTV in Spain, Italy, Asia, Scandinavia, Brazil and Latin America. It was directed by Chris Applebaum and filmed in Los Angeles from 7 to 10 October 2001. Two versions were filmed: one with the album version radio edit and the other with the remix by Miklós Malek and Levy Thomas Egry.

Charts

References

External links
 

2001 singles
2001 songs
Atlantic Records singles
M2M (band) songs
Songs written by Marit Larsen
Songs written by Marion Raven
Songs written by Peter Zizzo
Music videos directed by Chris Applebaum